Gilbert Fuchs (1871–1952) was a German figure skater who won the first World Figure Skating Championships, held in St. Petersburg, Russia, in 1896. He recaptured the world title ten years later in Munich.

Relations with his constant rival Ulrich Salchow were strained. In 1906, Salchow did not compete in Fuchs' hometown of Munich, because he expected that he would be judged unfairly. Likewise, Fuchs did not participate in the 1908 Olympics as he felt the judges favored Salchow. Only once did Fuchs place higher in a competition than Salchow, at the 1901 Europeans in Vienna; he did not win the event, however, finishing in second place to Gustav Hügel of Austria.

Fuchs mastered figure skating on his own, after learning gymnastics, weightlifting, and stone put. After finishing secondary school, he served in a cavalry regiment, later studying agriculture in Vienna. Still later, he moved to Munich in the German state of Bavaria, where he studied forestry. He practised figure skating on Germany's first artificial ice rink, "Unsöldsche Kunsteisbahn", which opened in 1892, and he represented Munich EV and Germany in competitions. Fuchs was a founding member of the Karlsruhe Ice Skating Club, founded in 1911. He wrote a book titled "Theory and Practice of Figure Skating" (German: "Theorie und Praxis des Kunstlaufes am Eise"), published in 1926.

Outside figure skating, Fuchs studied the morphology of the bark beetle (German: Borkenkäfer). In 1929, in his late fifties, he wrote his PhD thesis titled "European timber industry after the war" (German: "Europäische Holzwirtschaft der Nachkriegszeit") (the "war" referred to in the title is the First World War).

Results 

† Did not enter after being injured in a hunting accident in the high mountains

References

Navigation 

1871 births
1952 deaths
Sportspeople from Graz
German entomologists
German male single skaters
World Figure Skating Championships medalists
European Figure Skating Championships medalists